The Intrigues were an American four piece music group from Philadelphia, formed in 1968 consisting of Alfred Brown, James Harris, James Lee and Ronald Hamilton. Among their U.S. hits were "In a Moment", produced by Bobby Martin and Thom Bell, and "The Language of Love", co-produced by Van McCoy. An LP, by the same name as their hit "In a Moment", was produced in 1970 but did not achieve the same success. After an extended hiatus, starting in 1972, the group began recording again in 1985.  William Nobles Sr. became the group's lead vocalist and guitarist. The original "The intrigues" Was created in Boston, MA a few years before " The intrigues" from Philadelphia.

Singles

References

Musical groups from Philadelphia
American musical trios